Get It Right or Getting It Right may refer to:

Music
Get It Right (album), by Aretha Franklin (1983)

Songs
"Get It Right" (Aretha Franklin song) (1983)
"Get It Right" (Glee cast song) (2010)
"Get It Right", by Keyshia Cole from Woman to Woman (2012)
"#GETITRIGHT", by Miley Cyrus from Bangerz (2013)
"Get It Right", by Fantasia Barrino from Side Effects of You (2013)
"Get It Right", by Teedra Moses from Cognac & Conversation (2015)
"Get It Right", by Diplo (2017)
"Get It Right", by Gary Walker (1966)
"Get It Right", by Joe Fagin (1986)
"Get It Right", by Juvenile from Tha G-Code (1999)
"Get It Right", by The Offspring from Baghdad (1991)
"Get It Right", by Ralph Carter (1985)
"Get It Right", by Raven from Stay Hard (1985)
"Get It Right", by Rose Tattoo (1986)
"Get It Right", by Russell Morris & The Rubes (1982)
"Gettin' It Right", by Alison Limerick (1992)

Other media
Getting It Right (film), a 1989 film directed by Randal Kleiser
Getting It Right, a 2003 novel by William F. Buckley Jr.